Fort Collins is a city in the U.S. state of Colorado.

Fort Collins may also refer to:
 "Fort Collins" (song), a 2015 song by Hopsin
 "Fort Collins" (South Park), an episode of the television series South Park